Kilsallagh is a townland in the 
civil parish of Templeport, County Cavan, Ireland. It lies in the Roman Catholic parish of Templeport and barony of Tullyhaw.

Geography

Kilsallagh is bounded on the north by Killycrin townland, on the west by Muinaghan and Port, Templeport townlands, on the south by Cor, Templeport townland and on the east by Keenagh, Templeport, Munlough North and Killywaum townlands. Its chief geographical features are two streams, some spring wells and dug wells. The Ordnance Survey Namebooks for 1836 state- The soil is of a light yellow clay, intermixed with boulders of freestone. Kilsallagh is traversed by the regional N87 road (Ireland), minor roads and rural lanes. The crossroads named Father Terence's Cross was named after the nearby residence of the local Roman Catholic curate at the time, Terence Magauran, who was curate of Templeport parish from 1849 to 1877 and later parish priest from 1877 to 1896. The townland covers 169 statute acres.

History

In medieval times the McGovern barony of Tullyhaw was divided into economic taxation areas called ballibetoes, from the Irish Baile Biataigh (Anglicized as 'Ballybetagh'), meaning 'A Provisioner's Town or Settlement'. The original purpose was to enable the farmer, who controlled the baile, to provide hospitality for those who needed it, such as poor people and travellers. The ballybetagh was further divided into townlands farmed by individual families who paid a tribute or tax to the head of the ballybetagh, who in turn paid a similar tribute to the clan chief. The steward of the ballybetagh would have been the secular equivalent of the erenagh in charge of church lands. There were seven ballibetoes in the parish of Templeport. Kilsallagh was located in the ballybetagh of "Balleagheboynagh" (alias 'Ballyoghnemoynagh'). The original Irish is Baile Na Muighe Eanach, meaning 'The Town of the Marshy Plain'). The ballybetagh was also called "Aghawenagh", the original Irish is Achadh an Bhuí Eanaigh, meaning 'The Field of the Yellow Bog').

Until after the Cromwellian Act for the Settlement of Ireland 1652 the modern townland of Killywaum formed a sub-division of Kilsallagh.

The 1609 Ulster Plantation Baronial Map depicts the townland as Kilsallagh.

The 1652 Commonwealth Survey lists the townland as Kilsallagh.

An 1809 map of the ecclesiastical lands in Templeport depicts it as Kilsoldagh, with a sub-division on the north-east entitled Gortinawaghey.

On 19 January 1586 Queen Elizabeth I of England granted a pardon (No. 4813) to Ferriell M'Manus M'Thomas Magawran of Killsollaghe for fighting against the Queen's forces. The said Farrell McGovern was
the grandson of Tomás mac Maghnus Mág Samhradháin who was chief of the McGovern Clan from 1512 to 1532.

In the Plantation of Ulster by grant dated 26 June 1615, King James VI and I granted, inter alia, two polls in Kilsallagh to Sir George Graeme and Sir Richard Graeme to form part of the Manor of Greame. An Inquisition held at Cavan Town on 31 October 1627 found that Sir Richard Greames of Corrasmongan died on 7 November 1625 seized of, inter alia, one poll in Kilsallagh. His son and heir Thomas Greames was aged 40 (born 1585) and married.  Further that George Greames was also seized of one poll in Kilsallagh and he died 9 October 1624. By his will dated 1 May 1615 he left his lands to his son and heir William Greames then 30 years old (born 1594) and unmarried.

Father Shane McBrian, the Roman Catholic curate of Templeport, lived in the townland in the 1640s and took part in the Irish Rebellion of 1641, according to the following deposition of William Reynolds of Lissanover-

folio 260r
 William Reynolds Jur 6o Apr 1643 Will: Aldrich Hen: Brereton John Sterne: Cavan William Reinolds Jur 6o Apr 1643 Intw Cert fact [Copy at MS 832, fols 59r-59v]

After the Cromwellian Act for the Settlement of Ireland 1652, the Graham family's lands in Kilsallagh were confiscated and distributed as follows-

The 1652 Commonwealth Survey lists the proprietor as Mr Thomas Worsopp and the tenant as William Lawther, both of whom appear as proprietor and tenant for several other Templeport townlands in the same survey.

A deed dated 19 May 1736 by Owen Wynne includes the lands of Killsallagh.

The 1790 Cavan Carvaghs list spells the townland name as Kilsallagh.

The Tithe Applotment Books for 1827 list twenty six tithepayers in the townland.

In 1833 one person in Kilsallagh was registered as a keeper of weapons- James Delacy.

The Kilsallagh Valuation Office Field books are available for November 1839.

Griffith's Valuation of 1857 lists seventeen landholders in the townland. The landlord of Kilsallagh in the 1850s was the Reverend Sir James King.

Census

In the 1901 census of Ireland, there are sixteen families listed in the townland, and in the 1911 census of Ireland, there are twelve families listed in the townland.

Antiquities

There don't seem to be any structures of historical interest in the townland apart from 'Mountain View'Mountain View, KILSALLAGH (TULLYHAW BY.), County Cavan cottage and a footstick over a stream.

References

External links
The IreAtlas Townland Data Base

Townlands of County Cavan